Rosita Airport  is a private airport serving Rosita, Nicaragua.

Airlines and destinations

See also

 List of airports in Nicaragua
 Transport in Nicaragua

References

External links
 OurAirports - Rosita
 

Airports in Nicaragua
North Caribbean Coast Autonomous Region